Mossy Creek may refer to:

Mossy Creek (Chattahoochee River), a stream in Georgia
Mossy Creek, Georgia, an unincorporated community
Mossy Creek (Missouri), a stream in Missouri
Mossy Creek, Virginia, an unincorporated community
Mossy Creek, a district of Jefferson County, Tennessee, and the site of the Battle of Mossy Creek